Noelle Dominique Keselica (born August 6, 1984) is an American former soccer forward who most recently played for Atlanta Beat of Women's Professional Soccer. She was born in South Kingstown, Rhode Island.

References

External links
 Atlanta Beat player profile
 Virginia player profile

1984 births
Living people
NJ/NY Gotham FC players
Atlanta Beat (WPS) players
Virginia Cavaliers women's soccer players
Bälinge IF players
Damallsvenskan players
Expatriate women's footballers in Sweden
American expatriate women's soccer players
American expatriate sportspeople in Sweden
American women's soccer players
Women's association football forwards
Women's Professional Soccer players